Adelheid  is a 1970 Czechoslovak drama film directed by František Vláčil, based on a 1967 novel of the same name by Czech writer Vladimír Körner. The story is about the complicated relationship between Czech man Viktor and German woman Adelheid, and about relationships between Czechs and Germans in postwar Czechoslovakia in general.

Plot
Discharged Czechoslovak lieutenant Viktor Chotovický (Petr Čepek) returns to his homeland after spending much of the war in Aberdeen, Scotland employed at a RAF desk job. He has been appointed the trustee of an empty manor formerly occupied by the German family of a notorious Nazi war-criminal imprisoned by the Czechoslovak authorities. Viktor meets the Nazi's beautiful daughter Adelheid Heidenmann (Emma Černá), who is forced to work as a cleaning lady at her own mansion. Her brother is an SS officer who allegedly disappeared in the Eastern Front. Viktor makes Adelheid his captive maid, and soon falls in love with her. His heart is torn between feelings of desire and his national identity and sympathies. Adelheid also slowly becomes sympathetic towards Viktor, but at the same time silently hopes for the return of her brother Hansgeorg. When he does Viktor narrowly escapes death. Viktor refuses to testify against Adelheid because he is alone and has nobody else. However, Adelheid commits suicide in her cell, Viktor walks off into the snow-covered countryside and is last seen wandering towards a mine field.

Cast
 Petr Čepek as Viktor Chotovický
 Emma Černá as Adelheid Heidenmannová
 Jan Vostrčil as Officer Hejna
 Jana Krupičková as Czech Girl
 Pavel Landovský as Militiaman Jindra
 Lubomír Tlalka as Militiaman Karel
 Miloš Willig as Staff captain
 Karel Hábl as Lieutenant
 Zdeněk Mátl as Hansgeorg Heidenmann
 Alžběta Frejková as Old German woman
 Josef Němeček as Slovak
 Karel Bělohradský as Militiaman 
 Vlasta Petříková as Woman

Production

As in other novels by Körner, the story is set in Sudetenland in Northern Moravia. The movie was shot in Lužec castle located close the town of Vroutek (German: Rudig) in western Bohemia and in the villages close to Liberec in Northern Bohemia.

The soundtrack, adapted by Zdeněk Liška is based on existing music by Bach and Strauss, which complements the atmosphere of the film. The film was produced by Film Studio Barrandov Czechoslovakia in 1969.

Reception
The film has received very positive reviews after its release in 1969. Many critics called it Vláčil's second best film (after Marketa Lazarová). The film wasn't taken pleasantly by authorities and it received limited release and propagation which resulted in a small attendance in cinemas.

Accolades

References

External links
 

1970 films
1970s war drama films
1970s Czech-language films
Czechoslovak drama films
Films directed by František Vláčil
Films set in country houses
Czech war drama films
Golden Kingfisher winners
1970 drama films
Czech psychological drama films